"The One Where Ross Got High" is the ninth episode of Friends sixth season. It first aired on the NBC network in the United States on November 25, 1999.

Plot
Monica, preparing the Thanksgiving Day dinner, receives a phone call from her parents, who are planning to join them. Chandler is astonished to discover that she has not told them yet that he has moved in with her: she has avoided it because they do not like him. Chandler promises to win them over as best he can. Joey's new roommate, Janine, invites Joey and Ross to celebrate Thanksgiving with her friends, most of whom are attractive female dancers like her. Monica refuses to let them go, as they had earlier promised to spend Thanksgiving in her apartment, and Joey mopes around the apartment for the rest of the episode.

When the Gellers arrive, Phoebe is disturbed to discover she has a crush on Monica's father, Jack. She dreamed about him several days ago and has just had him walk into her life. Chandler's attempts to charm Jack and Judy are less than effective, but Ross figures out the source of their dismay when Judy sneaks in a comment that Chandler is probably stoned again. During his college years, Ross once tried marijuana; when his parents walked in on him, he claimed that Chandler had been smoking, and had just jumped out the window. Chandler and Monica demand he set the situation right, but he keeps ducking out of it for most of the episode.

Rachel has been entrusted with the makings of a dessert this year, despite her lack of success at culinary endeavors. She has chosen to make a traditional English trifle, which involves many layers of ladyfingers, jam, custard (made from scratch), raspberries, and beef sauteed with peas and onions, topped with bananas and cream. The beef in the trifle concerns Ross and Joey, and it eventually transpires that two of the pages in Monica's cookbook are stuck together, and her English trifle is actually half shepherd's pie. Rachel does not realise her mistake when she confuses a minced meat pie for a mince pie. Not wanting Rachel to begin again and delay their date with Janine's friends, Ross and Joey decide to convince everyone to pretend her "beef-custard thing" is actually delicious so as not to hurt her feelings. In an attempt to distract Rachel with conversation, Ross is misconstrued with trying to get back together with her, and Joey offers acting advice, but actually turns out to like the dish. Phoebe is unable to eat the dessert because she is a vegetarian and heads to Rachel's old bedroom to take a nap, which forces up a new dream in which Jack cheats on her, and she is swept off her feet by Jacques Cousteau instead. The others all make excuses to eat their portions in locations that will allow them to dispose of the mess discreetly, while Ross devours his portion to stop Rachel from realizing how bad it is.

After Ross again tries to get out of telling his parents the truth, Monica takes matters into her own hands. This leads to a barrage of shouted revelations, ranging from childhood grievances to the fact that Monica and Chandler are living together, that Ross was fired from the museum, then married Rachel and got another divorce. Phoebe loves Jacques Cousteau, Rachel has just discovered beef does not belong in a trifle, and Joey just wants to leave. After Judy acknowledges the three women and Joey about their revelations, she and Jack express their disappointment in Ross for his bad behavior then apologize to Chandler and thank him for not only making Monica happy, but for being Ross' best friend through three divorces and a drug problem.

During the closing credits, Rachel is incredulous that everyone ate the dessert she made just so she would not feel bad. However, each person confesses to not having eaten his or her portion of the trifle, only to find out that Joey polished off each abandoned serving of dessert.

Reception
Purple Clover placed the episode on their list of "20 Funniest Episodes of Friends".
The website Digital Spy ranked it the twelfth best Friends episode.
GamesRadar+ ranked "The One Where Ross Got High" the sixteenth best Friends episode.
Radio Times ranked it the eleventh funniest Friends episode.

References

1999 American television episodes
Friends (season 6) episodes